Charlotte Le Noir de la Thorillière, stage name Mademoiselle Baron (1661 – 1730), was a French stage actress. 

She was engaged at the Molière's company in 1673. She became a Sociétaires of the Comédie-Française in 1680. She retired in 1729.

References

External links 
  Mademoiselle Baron, Comédie-Française

1661 births
1730 deaths
17th-century French actresses
French stage actresses